Vance International Airlines was an American supplemental and air-taxi airline that started operations in 1949.

History
Vance was headquartered at Boeing Field (officially King County Airport) in Seattle, Washington.  Its founder and president was Vance B. Roberts. In 1962 the US Civil Aeronautics Board granted interim authority to Vance International Airways as an air taxi operator and supplemental carrier within the continental United States of America .  As of April 1967 the company's fleet was itemized as one Douglas DC-3 (N57131), one Douglas DC-7, and one Curtiss C-46, with two DC-7s on order.

In 1968 the company had received permanent operating authority.  In 1969 the company's fleet was still listed as one DC-3, one DC-7 and one C-46.

In 1969 the company received authority to operate flights to Mexico and Canada.

McCulloch International Airlines
In 1970 Vance was purchased by McCulloch Oil Company.  The McCulloch group issued $30 million in convertible subordinated debentures, in order to finance this acquisition.  At that time the airline company's name was changed to McCulloch International Airlines, and its main function was to fly potential land purchasers to the McCulloch properties at Lake Havasu City, Arizona. McCulloch International operated a small fleet of Lockheed L-188 Electra turboprops as well as Boeing 720 and Douglas DC-8 jetliners and previously operated a Lockheed Constellation propliner which was named "Lake Havasu City". The airline was based at the Long Beach Airport in California.

Fleet

McCulloch International Airlines operated a Lockheed Constellation propliner, Lockheed L-188 Electra turboprops, and Boeing 720 and Douglas DC-8 jetliners.

See also 
 List of defunct airlines of the United States

References

Defunct airlines of the United States
Airlines established in 1949
American companies established in 1949